Trapania luquei is a species of sea slug, a dorid nudibranch, a marine gastropod mollusc in the family Goniodorididae.

Description
The length of the body attains 12 mm.

Distribution
This species was first described from the Cape Verde Islands.

Ecology
Trapania luquei probably feeds on Entoprocta which often grow on sponges and other living substrata.

References

Goniodorididae
Gastropods described in 1989
Gastropods of Cape Verde